Sheetala , also spelled as Shitala and Seetla, is a Hindu goddess venerated primarily in North India. She is regarded to be an avatar of the goddess Durga. She is believed to cure poxes, sores, ghouls, pustules, and diseases, and most directly linked with the disease smallpox. Sheetala is worshipped on Tuesday Saptami  and Ashtami (the seventh and eighth day of a Hindu month), especially after Holi during the month of Chaitra. The celebration of the goddess Sheetala on the seventh and eighth day of the Hindu month is referred to as the Sheetala Saptami and Sheetala Asthami, respectively .

Legends associated

The deity is principally featured as a women’s goddess, portrayed as a mother who defends children from paediatric ailments, such as exanthemata. She also serves as a fertility goddess, who assists women in finding good husbands and the conception of healthy sons. Her auspicious presence promises the welfare of the family, and is also considered to protect the devotee's sources of livelihood. Sheetala is also summoned to ensure refreshing rainfall and the prevention of famines, droughts, as well as cattle diseases.

The Skanda Purana describes her role:

Name and variants
In Sanskrit, the name 'Sheetala' (शीतला śītalā) literally means 'the one who cools'; as an epithet of the mother goddess or Devi
revered in Hinduism, 'Sheetala' represents the divine blessing of bestowing relief from suffering, like how a cool breeze relieves the weary traveller on a sweltering day. Goddess Sheetala is worshipped under varying names across the Indian subcontinent. Devotees most often refer to Goddess Sheetala using honorific suffixes reserved for respected motherly figures, vis-à-vis Sheetala-Ma (Hindi: मां māṃ), Sheetala-Mata (Sanskrit: माता mātā), Sheetala-Amma (Kannada: ಅಮ್ಮ am'ma), etc. Sheetala is revered by Hindus, Buddhists, as well as by Adivasi communities. She is mentioned in Tantric and Puranic literature, and her later appearance in vernacular texts (such as the Bengali 17th century Sheetala-mangal-kabyas, 'auspicious poetry' written by Manikram Gangopadhyay) has contributed to popularising her worship.

Sheetala Devi's worship is especially popular in the regions of North India, where she is traditionally identified as an aspect of goddess Parvati, the divine consort of Shiva. In addition to being addressed as 'Mother', Sheetala Devi is also revered with honorific titles such as Thakurani, Jagrani (queen of the world), Karunamayi (she who is full of mercy), Mangala (the auspicious one), Bhagavati (the goddess), Dayamayi (she who is compassionate, full of grace, and kindness). In Gurgaon of Haryana, Sheetala is considered to be Kripi (the wife of Drona) and worshipped in the Sheetala Mata Mandir Gurgaon. In South India, the functions of Sheetala is taken by the goddess incarnate Mariamman, who is widely worshipped by the Dravidians.

Sheetala Puja
The worship of Shitala is conducted only by women (now men also take part in the ceremony). She is primarily worshipped in the dry seasons of winter and spring on the day, which is known as Sheetala Satam. There are many arti sangrah and stutis for the puja of Seetala. Some of them are Shri Shitla Mata Chalisa, Shitala Maa ki arti, and Shri Shitala Mata ashtak.

According to common belief, many families do not light their stoves on Ashtami/Saptami day, and all devotees cheerfully eat cold food (Cooked the previous night) in the form of prasada. The idea behind this is that as spring fades and summer approaches,  cold food should be avoided.

Iconography and symbolism

Sheetala is represented as a young maiden crowned with a winnowing-fan, riding a donkey, holding a short broom (either to spread or dust off germs) and a pot full of pulses (the viruses) or cold water (a vital  healing tool). In smaller shrines typically found in rural village settings where the attendees are primarily from the Bahujan and Adivasi communities, Sheetala-Amma may be simply represented by smooth stone slabs with facial features painted on, and additional decorative adornments occasionally donated by devotees. Notably, references to neem leaves are ubiquitous in Sheetala-Ma's liturgy and also appear in her iconography. This association with neem (Azadirachta indica) leaves likely demonstrates that this medicinal herb had indeed been recognised as possessing observable physiological, pharmacodynamic effects. Moreover, neem does find extensive mention in the Sushruta Samhita, where it is listed as an effective antipyretic, as well as a remedy for certain inflammatory skin conditions.

Sheetala is a form of Goddess Katyayani. She provides coolness to the patients of fever. According to the Devi Mahatmyam, when an asura named Jvarasura gave bacterial fever to all the children, goddess Katyayani arrived in her avatar of Sheetala to purify the children's blood by ridding them of the fever-causing bacteria, and vanquishing the evil Jvarasura. In Sanskrit  means 'fever', and  means 'coolness'. In North Indian iconography, Sheetala is often depicted with Jvarasura as her eternal servant. Other deities often worshipped alongside Sheetala Devi include Ghentu-debata, the god of skin diseases; Raktabati, the goddess of blood infections and the sixty-four epidemics; and Oladevi, another disease goddess (some say of cholera).

She is also depicted enthroned in an eight-handed form holding trident, broom, discus (cakra), a jar of abrasia, or a pot full of water, branches of neem, Scimitar, conch. and vard mudra. She is also flanked by two donkeys. This depiction has established her as a goddess of protection, good fortune, health, and power.

Buddhism
In Buddhist legends, Jvarasura and Shitala are depicted sometimes as companions of Paranasabari, the Buddhist goddess of diseases. Jvarasura and Sheetala are shown escorting her to her right and left side, respectively.

Sheetala temples in India

Some of the notable temples:
 Sheetala Mata Mandir, Mand, Dist. - Mandla , MP
 Sheetala Mata birthplace, Maghra, Bihar Sharif, Nalanda, Bihar 
 Sheetla Mata Mandir, Amritsar, Punjab 
Sheetla mata mandir,agam kuan, Patna,Bihar
 sheetla mata mandir,kharsia,chhattisgarh
 Sheetala Mata Mandir, Mehandi Ganj, Lucknow, Uttar Pradesh 
 Sheetala Mata Mandir, PitaMaheshwar Kund, Gaya, Bihar 
 Sheetala Mata Mandir, Mainpuri, Uttar Pradesh
Rejidi Khejdi Mandir, (Kajra, near Surajgarh, Jhunjunu district) Rajasthan
 Sheetala Mata Mandir, Meerut, Uttar Pradesh
 Sheetala Chaukiya Dham Sheetala mata Mandir, Jaunpur
 Sheetala Mata Mandir Gurgaon
 Sheetala Mata Temple, Khanda, Sonipat
 Maa Sheetala chaukiya Dham, Jaunpur
 Shree Sheetala Mata Mandir, Adalpura, Mirzapur, Uttar Pradesh
 Shitla Mata Mandir, Jalore, Rajasthan 
 Sheetala Mata Temple, Reengus, Rajasthan
 Sheetala Mata Mandir, Garia, Kolkata
 Sheetala Mata Mandir, Una, Himachal Pradesh
 Sheetala Mata Mandir, Palampur, Himachal Pradesh
 Harulongpher Shitalabari, Lumding, Nagaon, Assam
 Shitala Mata Mandir, Jodhpur, Rajasthan
 Sheetala Mata Mandir, Kaushambhi, Uttar Pradesh 
 Shitala Mata Mandir, Nizambad, Azamgarh, Uttar Pradesh
 Shitala mata mandir, Sitaliya, Gujarat
 Sheetala Mata Mandir, Barmer, Rajasthan
 Sheetala Mata Mandir, Bidhlan, Sonipat
 Sheetala Mata Mandir, Farrukhabad
 Shitala Devi Temple, Gurgaon
Shitala Maa Temple, Samta
 Sheetala Mata Mandir Anjaniya, Mandla 481998

 Shitla Devi Mandir, Mahim, Mumbai
Shitala Mandir, Jamshedpur, Jharkhand 
Shitla Devi Mandir, Chembur, Mumbai
 Shitala Devi Mandir, Barad, Maharashtra.
 Sheetala Devi Mandir, Ranibagh, Nainital, Uttarakhand

See also
Lakshmi
Vishnu
Ashvins
Sita
Dhanvantari

Notes
Arnold, D. (1993) Colonizing the Body: State Medicine and Epidemic Disease in Nineteenth-Century India, Berkeley, University of California Press.
Auboyer, J. and M.T. de Mallmann (1950). ‘Śītalā-la-froide: déesse indienne de la petite vérole’, Artibus Asiae, 13(3): 207-227.
Bang, B.G. (1973). ‘Current concepts of the smallpox goddess Śītalā in West Bengal’, Man in India, 53(1):79-104.
Kinsley, D. Hindu Goddesses: Visions of the Divine Feminine in the Hindu Religious Tradition
Dimock, E.C. Jr. (1982) ‘A Theology of the Repulsive: The Myth of the Goddess Śītalā’, in J.S. Hawley and D.M. Wulff (eds), The Divine Consort: Rādhā and the Goddesses of India, Berkeley, University of California Press, 184-203
Ferrari, Fabrizio M. (2009). “Old rituals for new threats. The post-smallpox career of Sitala, the cold mother of Bengal”. In Brosius, C. & U. Hüsken (eds.), Ritual Matters, London & New York, Routledge, pp. 144–171.
Ferrari, Fabrizio M. (2015).  Religion, Devotion and Medicine in North India. The Healing Power of Śītalā. London: Bloomsbury.
Inhorn, M.C. and P.J. Brown (eds) (2005). The Anthropology of Infectious Disease. International Health Perspectives, Amsterdam, Routledge.
Junghare, I.Y. (1975) ‘Songs of the Goddess Shitala: Religio-cultural and Linguistic Features’, Man in India, 55(4): 298-316.
Katyal, A. and N. Kishore (2001) ‘Performing the goddess: sacred ritual into professional performance’, The Drama Review, 45(1), 96-117.
Kolenda, P. (1982) ‘Pox and the Terror of Childlessness: Images and Ideas of the Smallpox Goddess in a North Indian Village’, in J.J. Preston (ed.), Mother Worship, Chapel Hill, University of North Carolina Press, 227-250
Mukhopadhyay, S.K. (1994) Cult of Goddess Śītalā in Bengal: An Enquiry into Folk Culture, Calcutta, Firma KLM.
Nicholas, R. (2003). Fruits of Worship. Practical Religion in Bengal, Chronicle Books, New Delhi.
Stewart, T.K. (1995) ‘Encountering the Smallpox Goddess: The Auspicious Song of Śītalā’, in D.S. Lopez, Jr. (ed.), Religious of India in Practice, Princeton, Princeton University Press, 389-397.
Wadley, S.S. (1980) ‘Śītalā: The Cool One’, Asian Folklore Studies, 39: 33-62.

References

Hindu goddesses
Mother goddesses
Plague gods
Smallpox deities
Hindu folk deities
Vajrayana and women